Mount Aspiring / Tititea is New Zealand's 23rd-highest mountain. It is the country's highest outside the Aoraki / Mount Cook region.

Description
Māori named it Tititea, after a chief of the Waitaha tribe, who were the first people to settle the South Island. It was named Aspiring in December 1857 by the Chief Surveyor for the Otago Province, John Turnbull Thomson. It is also often called 'the Matterhorn of the South,' for its pyramidal peak when seen from the Matukituki River. The first ascent was on 23 November 1909 by Major Bernard Head and guides Jack Clarke and Alec Graham. Head's party climbed to the summit ridge by the west face from the Bonar Glacier, a route not repeated until 1965.

Mount Aspiring / Tititea sits slightly to the west of the main divide, 30 kilometres west of Lake Wānaka. It lies at the junction of three major glacial systems – the Bonar Glacier, which drains into the Waipara River, and the Volta and Therma Glaciers, which both drain into the Waiatoto River. The Waipara is a tributary of the Arawhata River, and both the Arawhata and Waitoto Rivers flow out to the west coast in between Haast and Jackson Bay.

Climbing
The most used route to Mount Aspiring is up the West Matukituki Valley, which is at the end of a 50-kilometre road from Wānaka at Raspberry Flat. From here a network of huts provide staging points for climbers.

The first is Mount Aspiring Hut, which is 8 kilometres (or approximately two hours' walk) from the end of the road. The next hut is an 8-12hr hike away that is mainly off trail. The trail only provides a route for the first half of the approach that winds through the flat valley floor. From the end of the trail one can either ascend the French Ridge and traverse the Bonar Glacier, or ascend Bevan Col to the Bonar Glacier. Both require good route finding skills and knowledge of rock climbing techniques and glacial travel. Many climbers opt to fly in via helicopter because of the gruelling approach.

The mountain and park are popular with climbers and trampers, so has experienced a number of accidents and deaths.

See also
 List of mountains of New Zealand by height

References

External links
 Prelude to Aspiring A 1949 documentary by Brian Brake.

Mountains of Otago
Mount Aspiring National Park
Southern Alps
Mountains of the West Coast, New Zealand
Westland District